Patgram is an upazila of Lalmonirhat District in the Division of Rangpur, Bangladesh. It is a class upazila in Bangladesh.

Geography
It has 30271 households and total area 261.51 km2.

Demographics
As of the 1991 Bangladesh census, Patgram has a population of 155,913 with males constituting 51.52% of the population, and females 48.48%. This Upazila's eighteen up population is 75,134. Patgram has a literacy rate of 25.2%, against the national average literacy rate of 32.4%.

Administration
Patgram Upazila is divided into Patgram Municipality and eight union parishads: Baura, Burimari, Dahagram, Jagatber, Jongra, Kuchilbari, Patgram, and Sreerampur. The union parishads are subdivided into 45 mauzas and 46 villages.

Patgram Municipality is subdivided into 9 wards and 23 mahallas.

Transportation
Patgram is well connected with capital city Dhaka by road and train.  The Tin Bigha Corridor also connects the community with the nearby exclave of Dahagram–Angarpota.

See also
Upazilas of Bangladesh
Districts of Bangladesh
Divisions of Bangladesh

References

Upazilas of Lalmonirhat District